This is a list of commercial banks in Seychelles.

 Absa Bank Seychelles
 MCB Seychelles Limited
 Bank of Baroda
 Nouvobanq
 Seychelles Commercial Bank 
 Al Salam Bank Seychelles Limited
 Bank of Ceylon
 Bank AL Habib Limited
 SBM Bank Seychelles Limited (Closed all local banking activities in Seychelles during Covid'19 pandemic, and closed its Seychelles branch mid 2020)

See also
 List of banks in Africa
 Central Bank of Seychelles
 Economy of Seychelles
 List of companies based in Seychelles

References

External links
Website of Central Bank of Seychelles

Banks
Seychelles
Banks of Seychelles
Seychelles